Ramgarh is a village located in Jaisalmer district of Rajasthan in India. It comes under Jaisalamer tehsil. Ramgarh is 52 km west of the district headquarters Jaisalmer.

The PIN code of Ramgarh village is 345022.

Ramgarh also has the largest TV tower in Rajasthan which was constructed in 1993.

Public Demographic 

According to the 2011 census Ramgarh has population of 832222.

References

Villages in Jaisalmer district